Benjamin Harrison Dibblee (July 8, 1876 – November 11, 1945) was an American football player and coach. He played halfback for Harvard University from 1896 to 1898, and was a consensus All-American in 1897 and 1898.  Dibblee served as the head football coach for Harvard from 1899 to 1900, compiling a 20–1–1.  His 1899 team was retroactively recognized as a national champion by a number of selectors.

Dibblee attended preparatory school at the Groton School where he played on the football team and took a prominent role in athletics.  Dibblee was small for a football player, even by the standards of the 1890s, standing 5 feet, 8-8½ inches, and weighing only 156 pounds.  He enrolled at Harvard in 1895 and played on the freshman football team that year. In 1896, he played on the varsity team where he played in one or two games at fullback.  He was a starter for Harvard throughout his junior season in 1897.  As a senior in 1898, Dibblee was selected as captain of Harvard's football team and as a first-team All-American by Walter Camp, Caspar Whitney for Harper's Weekly, the Syracuse Herald, The Sun, and the New York Evening Telegram.  In late November 1897, Dibblee was elected by his teammates as the captain of the 1898 Harvard football team.

In March 1899, Dibblee was appointed as head coach of the Harvard football team.  As of 1913, Dibblee was the Pacific coast manager for a firm of brokers. Dibblee died on November 11, 1945 at the Joy Island Duck club near Fairfield, California.

Head coaching record

References

External links

1876 births
1945 deaths
19th-century players of American football
American football halfbacks
Harvard Crimson football coaches
Harvard Crimson football players
All-American college football players
People from Ross, California
Players of American football from California
Sportspeople from the San Francisco Bay Area